On the  weekend of 8 – 11 April 1977 a bank robbery took place at the Standard Bank in Krugersdorp, South Africa. The robbers gained access to the bank vault by digging a tunnel underneath the building.  Over R 400,000 (equivalent to over R  million in ) was stolen in the robbery. To this day, the case remains unsolved and no arrests were made.

Modus Operandi

The empty shop from which the tunnel started was rented by Mr Nightingale. Nightingale’s reason for renting the shop was to utilise it as a photo studio. Investigation afterwards showed that it was a false name, and so was the residential address provided to the owner of the shop.  The address was an address in Linden Johannesburg but the person staying there was cleared by the police as not involved. The windows of the shop were covered with newspaper.

The robbery
The soil taken from the tunnel was emptied into  bags and stored in bags in a walk in strongroom at the rear of the premises. Work was done on the tunnel at night and the windows of the shop were covered with brown paper as most people would do when fitting out a new business and thus caused no suspicion. The shaft was cleverly hidden by a trap door in the floor. 

The perpetrators had installed wooden poles to stabilise the tunnel and prevent it from collapsing. It took 3 months to complete. Once inside the bank, the robbers broke a hole in the brick wall and opened the safe using an oxyacetylene torch. During the investigation, evidence was found to suggest that food was prepared inside the safe.  The bank had turned off its trembler alarm systems due to compressors that were being used by a nearby building site. The robbery was only discovered the following Monday once the bank opened.

Stolen goods

The robbers took, cash, travellers’ cheques and jewellery in safety deposit boxes. The Saturday Star newspaper, in a 2013 retrospective article, stated that it was believed that the robbery actually netted approximately R 1 million (equivalent to R  million in ).

Investigations afterwards

Brigadier JF Roos from Pretoria was in charge of the investigation. Identikits of the robbers were drawn up by witnesses who said they saw the men on the weekend wearing blue overalls.

Outcome

No verifiable leads were ever produced, no arrests were made, and no verifiable conclusion(s) were ever made. It remains unresolved.

See also
 1971 Baker Street robbery
 2003 Antwerp diamond heist
 2005 Schiphol Airport diamond heist
 2013 Brussels Airport diamond heist
 2015 Hatton Garden safe deposit burglary
 List of missing treasures

References

1977 crimes
1977 in South Africa
Bank burglaries
Unsolved crimes in South Africa
1977 crimes in South Africa